Andrus Seeme (born on 8 November 1969 in Põlva) is an Estonian politician. He is a member of the XIV Riigikogu.

In 1993 he graduated from Estonian University of Life Sciences in agronomy speciality.

2001-2017 he was the mayor of Kõlleste Rural Municipality. 2017-2019 he was the mayor of Kanepi Rural Municipality.

Since 2002 he is a member of Estonian Reform Party.

References

1969 births
Estonian Reform Party politicians
Estonian University of Life Sciences alumni
Living people
Mayors of places in Estonia
Members of the Riigikogu, 2019–2023
Members of the Riigikogu, 2023–2027
People from Põlva